California's Great America, often shortened to Great America, is a  amusement park located in Santa Clara, California. Owned and operated by Cedar Fair, it originally opened in 1976 as one of two parks built by the Marriott Corporation. California's Great America features over 40 rides and attractions, and one of its most notable is Gold Striker, which has been featured as a top-ranked wooden roller coaster in Amusement Today's annual Golden Ticket Awards publication. Other notable rides include RailBlazer, a single-rail coaster from Rocky Mountain Construction, and Flight Deck, an inverted coaster from Bolliger & Mabillard. The park appeared in the 1994 films Beverly Hills Cop III and Getting Even with Dad.

Ownership of the park transitioned several times, beginning with the city of Santa Clara's acquisition from Marriott in 1985. It was then sold to Kings Entertainment Company in 1989 while Santa Clara retained ownership of the land. Paramount Parks acquired the park in 1992, followed by Cedar Fair in 2006. Santa Clara eventually sold the land occupied by the park to Cedar Fair in 2019, who then sold it to Prologis in 2022. While Cedar Fair plans to eventually close the park by 2033, the land rental agreement is a six-year lease through 2028 that gives Prologis the option of extending it another five years.

History

Marriott & KECO era (1976–1992)
The hotel and restaurant operator Marriott Corporation completed Marriott's Great America on the site of what had been a pear orchard and opened it to the public on March 20, 1976. There were 1,500 employees.

Less than two months later, on May 29, the company opened a second Marriott's Great America – later known as Six Flags Great America – north of Chicago in Gurnee, Illinois. A third park was initially planned for the Baltimore–Washington metropolitan area, but the idea was later abandoned after several failed attempts to sway local opposition.

The park, though profitable, was still an earnings disappointment for Marriott, leading the company in 1983 to explore options to sell. An interested party, Caz Development Co., appraised the land value at US$800,000 to $1 million per acre. Marriott also involved the city of Santa Clara in negotiations, which was already leasing  of parking space for the amusement park. Fearing homebuilding on the land by Caz Development would lower home values of existing homeowners, the city council approved a $101 million purchasing agreement on January 31, 1984, by a 4–3 vote that also had to be approved by city residents. The citywide vote passed, approving the sale by a margin of 3 to 1. Caz Development then sued the city and Marriott in the Superior Court of Santa Clara County to block the transaction. The court nullified the sale, forcing the city to attempt to salvage the deal through negotiations with the other parties. Unable to broker a timely agreement, the city council voted 6–1 to scuttle the sale on February 5, 1985, though the city was still interested in owning the park. After Marriott refunded a $20 million down payment back to the city, negotiations were restarted. All parties were able to agree on a compromise, which was signed in marathon sessions taking place in early June 1985. The city acquired the park for $93.5 million from Marriott, which retained  from the sale for development. Caz Development settled and was allowed to build a hotel and office near the park, which the city renamed Great America.

Kings Entertainment Company, who owned and operated other amusement parks, was hired in 1985 to manage Great America for the city. In 1989, the city sold the park to Kings Entertainment, while retaining ownership of the land that the park occupied. In the agreement, the city would earn 5% of all revenue that exceeds $56 million.

Paramount Parks era (1992–2006)
Three years later, Paramount Communications (formerly Gulf+Western), the owners of Paramount Pictures, sought to join other entertainment companies as a theme park owner. The company acquired Kings Entertainment for $400 million on July 31, 1992, and created Paramount Parks. As part of the acquisition, Paramount purchased the parks owned by Kings: Great America, Kings Dominion, Carowinds, and a 20% stake in Canada's Wonderland; in addition, Paramount would acquire Kings Island, which was operated by Kings for its owner, American Financial Corporation. Viacom, the parent of MTV Networks (including Nickelodeon), then assumed control of Paramount in 1994 by purchasing a controlling interest, allowing Nickelodeon theming and merchandise into the park as well. During the Paramount era, attractions from the Action FX Theatre, Nickelodeon Splat City (later Nickelodeon Central), Drop Zone Stunt Tower, Invertigo, and many more modern thrill ride attractions were added in. Because the park is constrained from further expansion by its location in the center of Silicon Valley, several rides including the classic train ride and the Sky Whirl, a Marriott's Great America signature attraction, were removed to make way for newer attractions.

Viacom went on to acquire CBS in 1999, which made the combined Viacom/CBS the parent company of Great America and several broadcasting affiliates in the Bay Area, including KPIX-TV (CBS) and KBCW (UPN). Viacom/CBS split in 2005, with the re-formed CBS Corporation assuming control of Paramount Parks, until CBS sold that unit to Cedar Fair in 2006.

Cedar Fair era (2006–present)
After Viacom and CBS Corporation split, Paramount Parks became a subsidiary of CBS. The theme park division was promptly put up for sale by CBS. In May 2006, Cedar Fair announced its acquisition of Paramount Parks.

Despite having a license agreement in place to retain Nickelodeon and Paramount branding for several years, Cedar Fair opted to remove them sooner. For the 2007 season, Paramount was dropped from the park's name, reducing it to Great America. The following season, Cedar Fair renamed it California's Great America in recognition of the park's original name. A Huss Rides top spin ride called FireFall was added that year, along with a new ice show in the Great America Theatre that was formerly called Paramount Theatre. Halloween Haunt, a Halloween-themed event held every weekend through the fall, also debuted at the park in 2008. The remaining Nickelodeon themes were replaced with characters and themes from Peanuts, a syndicated comic strip by Charles M. Schulz, for the 2010 season. The children's area was renamed Planet Snoopy. Similar changes were made at other Cedar Fair properties around the country.

On September 19, 2011, Cedar Fair confirmed reports that California's Great America would be sold to JMA Ventures, LLC for $70 million in cash. The sale required approval by the City of Santa Clara, and its city council was scheduled to vote on the matter on December 6, 2011. Cedar Fair, which purchased the park in 2006, expected to use the cash proceeds from the sale to reduce its senior secured debt. However, on December 6, 2011, JMA Ventures cancelled its plans to purchase the amusement park. In the same announcement, Cedar Fair also verified that a long-term agreement was reached with the San Francisco 49ers regarding parking and construction of a new stadium adjacent to Great America. Cedar Fair purchased the land beneath Great America from the city of Santa Clara in March 2019. The city retained the main parking lot in sale.

California's Great America did not operate in 2020 due to the COVID-19 pandemic. It reopened on May 22, 2021, initially in a limited capacity, where face masks and social distancing were required. Also in 2021, the Boomerang Bay water park reopened as South Bay Shores, featuring new water slides in several areas of the park.

In June 2022, Cedar Fair announced the sale of the land occupied by California's Great America for $310 million to Prologis, a Bay Area logistics real estate company. Cedar Fair stated that the sale will help them lower the company's corporate debt to $2 billion, adding that they intended to close the park by 2033. The terms of the agreement involve Prologis leasing the land for an initial period of six years with the option to renew the lease for an additional five years, although Prologis could terminate Cedar Fair's lease with as little as two years' notice. The mayor of Santa Clara, Lisa M. Gilmor, released a statement saying that the city only found out about the sale when the public did, that city officials planned to speak with Prologis to learn more details, and that the land is zoned for "theme park" use only.

Mascots
At the park's opening in 1976, the park featured appearances from Looney Tunes characters, including Bugs Bunny. After Marriott sold the Gurnee park to the Six Flags corporation, the rights to the Looney Tunes characters passed along to them, and the 1984 season was their final one. The park began using Hanna-Barbera properties in 1985, including The Smurfs, Scooby-Doo, and Yogi Bear. After the park was acquired by Cedar Fair, who held a license for Peanuts characters, the child-themed area was rethemed as Planet Snoopy.

Attractions by type

Note: Number ratings assigned per California's Great America, while the colors are unique to Wikipedia. For more details, refer to the California's Great America Guest Assistance Guide.

Roller coasters

Thrill rides

Park areas

The park is divided into several themed areas, laid out along an oval pathway nicknamed the "Duell Loop", which the park's designer, Randall Duell, had incorporated into several theme parks, including the Six Flags Great America sister park in Gurnee. This allows all areas of the park to be serviced from a central corridor, while visitors can experience the entire park by completing a single lap around it. In aerial photographs, the central service corridor in the Santa Clara park is visible as a straight road running almost directly north–south, terminating under the Patriot roller coaster. At the park's opening in 1976, there were five themed areas:
 Orleans Place, representing the old South
 Yankee Harbor, representing an early 19th-century Eastern seaboard village
 Yukon Territory, representing the Klondike Gold Rush
 The Great Midwest Livestock Exposition and County Fair, representing the early 20th century
 Hometown Square, representing a small American town in the 1920s

From the main entrance, visitors enter Celebration Plaza (originally Carousel Plaza); proceeding clockwise (turning left after passing Carousel Columbia), the themed areas are:
 Orleans Place (restoring the original name; an interim name was Pavilion Plaza)
 All American Corners (consolidating the original Yankee Harbor and Yukon Territory; previously known as All American Plaza) 
 Planet Snoopy (originally Fort Fun; intermediate brands included Kids Kingdom, Smurf Woods, KidZville, and Nickelodeon Central)
 Action Zone (originally The Great Midwest Livestock Exposition and County Fair, later abbreviated to simply County Fair)
 County Fair (restoring the original name; a portion had been split off and designated Festival Plaza)
 Hometown Square (restoring the original name; it had been incorporated into Celebration Plaza)

The entrance to the South Bay Shores water park is in All American Corners, near the bridge to Planet Snoopy. Typical visitor guide maps show the main entrance, which is in the northwest corner of the park, at the bottom of the map.

Action Zone
The Action Zone was divided from The Great Midwest Livestock Exposition and County Fair.

All American Corners

All American Plaza was formed by consolidating Yankee Harbor, Yukon Territory, and the southern portion of Orleans Place. These areas were delineated by covered bridges: Yankee Harbor was between the covered bridges leading to Orleans Place to the north and Fort Fun on the south, while Yukon Territory was separated from Yankee Harbor by a boardwalk next to The Revolution (later H.M.B. Endeavor) Looping Starship ride and lighthouse; another covered bridge led from Yukon Territory to County Fair, which is now part of Action Zone).

The signature rides in Yankee Harbor and Yukon Territory were the interlocking log flumes, which shared the same space on the east side of the park and had an entrance in each areas, flanking The Revolution and lighthouse. Much of what was Yukon Territory was renamed Nickelodeon Central by 2003, which was an extension of the Fort Fun/KidZville children's area.

This area was renamed All American Corners by 2009. The expansion of South Bay Shores in 2019–20 annexed a portion of All American Corners, including the lighthouse replica that was next to The Revolution/HMB Endeavor.

Celebration Plaza
Celebration Plaza is the park's entrance plaza, with often-photographed features including the reflecting pool, Carousel Columbia, and the park's name in flowers. By 1988, the area had been renamed Carousel Plaza and was separated from the adjoining Hometown Square by the park's perimeter railroad, which ran on an elevated track immediately behind the giant carousel. After the railroad and trolley were removed in 2000, the Hometown Square area was consolidated and renamed Celebration Plaza, although the area briefly bore the name Hollywood Plaza as well. The Hometown Square area was re-separated in 2021.

County Fair

County Fair was originally named The Great Midwest Livestock Exposition and County Fair; portions of it were split off to form Action Zone and Festival Plaza, but the latter was re-annexed into County Fair later. The original area, named The Great Midwest Livestock Exposition and County Fair, occupied most of the park's southern area, extending from a covered bridge into Yukon Territory (near the Centrifuge ride) to another bridge into Hometown Square (next to Whitewater Falls). Passenger service was provided by the park's perimeter railroad from Hometown Square, which stopped at the Fairground Junction station next to the picnic grounds and The Edge ride, and the Eagle's Flight station on the park's Von Roll gondola from Orleans Place.

By 2003, the area had been divided in two, with County Fair remaining in the southern part next to Nickelodeon Central (formed from the former Yukon Territory) while the western arm had been renamed Festival Plaza; the dividing line was the semi-circular Games Gallery, which hosted typical carnival games. By 2009, the former County Fair at the park's southern end was renamed the Action Zone, while Festival Plaza assumed the County Fair name.

In early 2011, the park made the decision to relocate Invertigo to another Cedar Fair property, Dorney Park & Wildwater Kingdom, stating that it was necessary to make room for a future attraction. RailBlazer, a single-rail roller coaster, eventually opened in its place in 2018.

Hometown Square
Hometown Square was annexed into Celebration Plaza, but was restored to a separate area later. Transportation within the park was provided by the perimeter railroad, which had one station in Hometown Square adjacent to Carousel Columbia connecting to a second station in County Fair where the Psycho Mouse roller coaster is today, and also by the trolley system, which ran in a square loop around the eponymous square in front of the Great America Theater, routed via Carousel Plaza through Orleans Place, where it terminated in another loop near where the Flying Eagles ride is today.

After the park's perimeter railroad and trolley were removed, the Hometown Square area was combined with Celebration Plaza by 2003; the areas were divided again by 2021.

Orleans Place
Orleans Place was renamed Pavilion Plaza at one point, reflecting its entrance to the picnic area named Great America Pavilion. Originally, Orleans Place extended from Celebration/Carousel Plaza to a covered bridge leading to Yankee Harbor and was divided in half by the perimeter railroad; the portion south of the railroad (including the trolley station/loop and the Orleans Orbit and Rip Roaring Rapids rides, approximately where Pizza Orleans is today) was annexed into All American Plaza when that area was formed by consolidating Yankee Village and Yukon Territory by 2003. The site of the trolley station/loop is now marked by the "1950s gazebo" in All American Corners.

Planet Snoopy

Planet Snoopy is California's Great America's kids area, which opened in 2010. The area was originally named Fort Fun and has seen the most name changes as brand licenses were updated following multiple ownership changes, including Kids Kingdom, Smurf Woods, Nickelodeon Central, and KidZville.

The original Fort Fun was a  area for children located in the center of the park, accessible only by footbridges over water from Yukon Territory. Smurf Woods opened in 1987 and was physically separated from Fort Fun by Yukon Territory.

By 1999, the water physically separating Fort Fun from Yukon Territory had been filled and by 2003, Smurf Woods had been replaced by Nickelodeon Central, which had annexed much of the former Yukon Territory and was adjoining Fort Fun, which had been renamed KidZville. The Nickelodeon Central area was renamed Planet Snoopy in 2010 and by 2016, the Planet Snoopy area had expanded to its present size by annexing the former KidZville/Fort Fun children's area.

South Bay Shores

South Bay Shores is a water park located within California's Great America that opened in 2004 as Crocodile Dundee's Boomerang Bay. The name was later shortened to just Boomerang Bay in 2007. In August 2019, it was announced that Boomerang Bay would be expanded and renamed South Bay Shores. Access to the water park is included with the price of admission to California's Great America.

Time Capsule
A time capsule was buried at then Paramount's Great America in the former KidZville area of the park on March 29, 2002. The time capsule is set to open on March 29, 2152. The time capsule reads, "At this site is buried a time capsule with essays by students in second through twelfth grades in the Santa Clara Unified School District and other local schools. What will the next 150 years in Santa Clara be like? In honor of the City of Santa Clara's sesquicentennial 1852-2002."

Defunct attractions
Past rides and attractions include:

Fast Lane

Fast Lane, first introduced at a Cedar Fair park in July 2011, is a secondary queue system that offers shorter wait times on the park's most popular rides. Fast Lane is a system where
in addition to a standard admission charge, visitors can purchase a wrist band. The band grants access to the Fast Lane queue. In theory, a limited number of wrist bands are available each day.

Former Halloween Haunt event

Halloween Haunt was a seasonal event at California's Great America, that began in the fall after the park has transitioned to weekend-only operation. It debuted in 2008 and last ran in 2021, and typically ran from mid-September through late October to coincide with Halloween, featuring haunted houses, mazes, live shows, and scare actors roaming throughout the park. Most rides and attractions remained in operation during this time, and the park's hours of operation were extended on Fridays and Saturdays. The event last operated on October 31, 2021.

On February 25, 2022, California's Great America announced that Halloween Haunt is being replaced for the 2022 season with a family-friendly, scare-free Halloween event called "Tricks and Treats". There will not be an adult, nighttime Halloween event at California’s Great America in 2022, although the Halloween Haunt event continues to run at several other Cedar Fair parks.

Haunt attractions

The last year of Halloween Haunt in 2021 featured five mazes, one scare zone, two party zones, and three live shows.

Park timeline 

2023: Park opens year round, return of Carnivale at Orleans Place and new PEANUTS Celebration.
 2022: Scrambler ride Liberty Twirler debuts along with revamped All American Corners area of park, A family-friendly event called Tricks and Treats permanently takes the place of Halloween Haunt.
 2021: Renovated South Bay Shores waterpark debuts.

 2020: Boomerang Bay expanded and renamed South Bay Shores, park remains closed for the entire season due to the COVID-19 pandemic.

 2019: Drop Tower receives new paint scheme depicting a redwood tree, Pre-K pass is introduced. 
 2018: Single-rail coaster RailBlazer debuts, Halloween Haunt and WinterFest are expanded.
 2017: Patriot is converted to floorless, Vortex is repainted and re-themed, Halloween Haunt and Winterfest expanded. FireFall, Logger's Run, H.M.B Endeavour, Snoopy's Splash Dance, and other structures are removed.
 2016: 4D holographic attraction themed to the video game Mass Effect debuts in newly-renovated Action Theater, Winterfest event added, Halloween Haunt expansion.
 2015: Planet Snoopy replaces KidZville
 2014: Flight Deck repainted red and white, Grizzly retracked and has its loading area painted red and white, Fun TV monitors added to ride line queues, and new flooring in Carousel Columbia.
 2013: New wooden coaster "Gold Striker" opens and Happy Feet: Mumble's Wild Ride debuts in the Action Theater.
 2012: Demon and Flight Deck repainted, elevator lift entrance for Loggers Run and Vortex, The Grizzly is retracked, Fast Lane added.

 2011: Invertigo removed and relocated to Dorney Park & Wildwater Kingdom
 2010: Planet Snoopy replaces Nickelodeon Central, Hanna Barbera references removed in KidZville

 2009: All Wheels Extreme Stunt show; Chipper Lowell Experience show
 2008: Park renamed California's Great America; FireFall; Dora's Sing-Along Adventure; Endless Summer On Ice show; Halloween Haunt debuts
 2007: Paramount dropped from the name, renamed Great America; Great Barrier Reef Wavepool added to Boomerang Bay; Ed Alonzo Misfit of Magic; Twistin' to the '60s Show
 2006: Tiki Twirl (Formerly Survivor: The Ride); Park is sold to Cedar Fair
 2005: Boomerang Bay expansion to include lazy river, two other waterslides and a large swimming pool.
 2004: Boomerang Bay is added including a complex of children's water slides/play area, a 4-person adult raft/tube ride, a two-person inner-tube water slide and a fully enclosed two-person inner-tube water slide. Triple Play is removed
 2003: SpongeBob SquarePants 3-D in the Action Theater; Nickelodeon Central (expansion of Splat City); Stealth (flying steel coaster) is removed and sent to Carowinds as Nighthawk
 2002: Delirium; Flying Eagles; Greased Lightning (shuttle loop coaster) is removed; Time Capsule buried
 2001: Psycho Mouse; Celebration Swings; Thunder Raceway; Stan Lee's seventh Portal 3D/ Smash Factory in Action Theater
 2000: Stealth (flying steel coaster) opens to the public; Scenic Railroad and Skyhawk are removed

 1999: KidZVille; Tidal Wave renamed Greased Lightnin'; Stealth is constructed and tested all season; Logger's Run modified to allow construction of Stealth

 1998: Invertigo; James Bond: License to Thrill; in the Paramount Action F/X Theater Yankee Clipper is removed
 1997: Xtreme Skyflyer; Triple Wheel (originally Sky Whirl) is removed
 1996: Drop Tower Scream Zone (Formerly Drop Zone Stunt Tower)
 1995: Nickelodeon Splat City; The Edge and Ameri- Go Round are removed.
 1994: Action Theater featuring Days of Thunder
 1993: Park is renamed Paramount's Great America; Flight Deck (Formerly Top Gun); Lobster is removed
 1992: KECO is acquired by Paramount, and renamed Paramount Parks; IMAX Pictorium Theater received a $1.5 million upgrade allowing it to screen 3-D films.
 1991: Vortex (March 9); Saskatchewan Scrambler is removed. 
 1990: Whitewater Falls (March 31)

 1989: Skyhawk (March 11); KECO purchases buildings, rides, and equipment from the City of Santa Clara (June 2); Dolphin and Seal show and Cajun Carpet are removed.
 1988: Rip Roaring Rapids (March 12). Whizzer and Bottom's Up are removed
 1987: Woodstock Express (Formerly Blue Streak/ Green Slime Mine Car Coaster/ Runaway Reptar); Smurf Woods (March 21); Fort Fun (March 21); HMB Endeavor (Formerly known as The Revolution, March 21)
 1986: The Grizzly (March 15); Redwood Amphitheater with the Miami Sound Machine (June 14)
 1985: Park is renamed Great America.
 1985: Park is sold by Marriott corporation to the City of Santa Clara (June 5); management transfers to Kings Entertainment Company (KECO)
 1984: Hilltopper is removed.
 1983: The Edge (June 18); Red Baron and Ladybugs are removed.
 1982: Atari Video Adventure
 1980: The Demon (remodeled from Turn of the Century, March 15); Gulf coaster is removed

 1979: Star Tower (formerly Sky Tower, March 31)
 1978: IMAX Pictorium Theater, with film Man Belongs to the Earth (June 3)
 1977: Tidal Wave (July 8)
 1976: Marriott's Great America opens (March 20)

In film and television

Beverly Hills Cop III
Though appearing under the name "Wonder World", Paramount's Great America was used for exterior scenes of the theme park in the 1994 film Beverly Hills Cop III (itself released by Paramount Pictures) after Knott's Berry Farm declined filming rights.

Writer Steven E. de Souza originally wrote the story as more "Die Hard in a theme park". He was told that each of the rides he had designed would cost about $10 million to build and the whole film would cost about $70 million. When box office results for The Distinguished Gentleman came in, Paramount ordered the budget to be cut to $55 million.

Some modifications were made to the Columbia Carousel and Vortex roller coaster. Most of the Sky Whirl/Triple Wheel stunts (renamed "The Spider" for the film) were filmed in a studio. To film the exterior scenes, the motors of the Triple Wheel were left unpowered; instead, to ensure the ride did not move too quickly, some cages were loaded with sandbags to unbalance the mechanism. In this scene, George Lucas has a small part as the man Axel cuts in front of to get on the ride, also known as 'disappointed man' (this can be seen in the credits). John Singleton and Martha Coolidge also made cameo appearances in the film.

Many rides that were seen in the movie including Triple Play/Sky Whirl have since been removed. Also, the carousel at the back of the park (the Ameri-Go-Round, not the Columbia Carousel) was altered. The Ameri-Go-Round carousel has since been removed and Drop Zone is now in its place. The tunnels that supposedly ran under the park are a myth as well. No tunnels run under the park, as many thought after this was released.

The Alien Attack ride featured in the Wonder World theme park was in fact the "Earthquake: The Big One" attraction from the Universal Studios Florida theme park in Orlando, Florida. The "aliens" featured in the ride are suited actors (and not animatronic as suggested in the film) that closely resembled the Cylons from the original Battlestar Galactica.

Other appearances
 Paramount's Great America was also used as the theme park Macaulay Culkin visits in the 1994 film Getting Even with Dad (which was released not by Paramount Pictures, but rather by Metro-Goldwyn-Mayer).
 The park's inverted steel coaster "Top Gun" (later renamed "Flight Deck") was featured in a 2007 Excedrin commercial with music from The Stremes.
 Marriott's Great America was used in the 1983 George Lucas and John Korty animated feature Twice Upon A Time. It was used both as a background for animated scenes and for a short live-action shot at the end of the film.

Incidents

 In 1980, a 13-year-old boy was killed and several others injured on the Willard's Whizzer roller coaster.
 In 1989, two boys intentionally jumped out of the Loggers' Run ride. One was killed and the other fell onto a platform and was injured.
 In 1998, after riding Flight Deck, a 24-year-old Spanish-speaking man, who could not read the English-language warning signs, entered a locked, gated area underneath the ride to retrieve his hat. He was hit by the foot of a passenger on the Flight Deck train and later died. The passenger suffered a broken leg.
 In 1999, a 12-year-old boy fell to his death on Drop Tower after slipping from the ride's restraints, which were still locked at the end of the ride.
 On July 12, 2007, a 4-year-old boy drowned in the Boomerang Bay's "Great Barrier Reef" (now known as South Bay Shores' "Breakers Bay") wave pool.
 On June 12, 2015, a maintenance worker was critically injured after being struck in the head by a moving train on Flight Deck. A passenger sustained serious hand and leg injuries in the incident.
 On July 4, 2019, the Santa Clara PD were called near the entrance of the park where a woman was shot during the evening of the fireworks show. The victim was struck on the arm by a handgun. She did not suffer any serious injuries and was also treated at the scene. It was ruled as an altercation between two family groups.
 On October 26, 2019, a group of teenagers sparked some firecrackers in the front gate causing guests to scramble, thinking it was a shooting. It was later determined to be due to a robbery. Concession stands within the park were also robbed by fleeing guests.

References

Notes
 Michelson, Herb. (June 7, 1984). "City will purchase Marriott's". The Sacramento Bee, p. A.
 "Santa Clara drops Great America pact". (February 7, 1985). San Francisco Chronicle, p. 4.
 Ewell, Miranda. (June 6, 1985). "Santa Clara assumes ownership of Great America". San Jose Mercury News (CA), p. 8B.
 Kava, Brad. (March 15, 1989). "Great America reopens". San Jose Mercury News, p. 1.
 Eng, Sherri. (August 1, 1992). "Paramount to buy Great America owner". San Jose Mercury News, p. 1E.

External links

 

 
Cedar Fair amusement parks
Amusement parks in California
1976 establishments in California
San Francisco Bay Area amusement parks
Economy of Santa Clara, California
Tourist attractions in Santa Clara, California
Amusement parks opened in 1976